Mary O'Malley may refer to:

 Mary O'Malley (author), American author and public speaker
 Mary O'Malley (director) (1918–2006), Irish theatre director
 Mary O'Malley (playwright) (1941–2020), English playwright
 Mary O'Malley (poet) (born 1954), Irish poet